Volt Sweden (Swedish: Volt Sverige; abbreviation: Volt) is a political party in Sweden and part of the pan-European party Volt Europa.

History 
Volt Sverige was founded on 2 July 2018 and stood in the 2019 European elections.

In early November 2021, the Liberalerna (The Liberals) association in Ljusnarsberg announced that they would initially convert to an association and run for Volt in the local elections because they disagreed with their party's rapprochement with the right-wing populist Sweden Democrats. The local elected representative joined Volt, giving the party its first and only mandate there to date.

Elections

2019 
Volt Sverige did contest the 2019 European Parliament elections, but without its own ballot papers and relying on voters to write the party's name on blank ballot papers. Top candidates were Michael Holz and Namie Folkesson. Volt received 146 such votes.

2022 
The party participated in the 2022 Swedish Parliamentary election and received 89 votes.

The party also contested regional elections in Stockholm and Skåne and municipal elections in Stockholm, Vaxholm, Malmö, Lund, Gothenburg, Linköping and Ljusnarsberg. Volt received 1.2% in Ljusnarsberg, falling short of re-entry into the municipal council.

Election results 

1.In Sweden, voters can write names of parties on the ballot paper without them formally running. 146 such votes were cast for Volt Sverige

External links 

 Volt Sweden Website

References 

Sweden
Pro-European political parties in Sweden
Social liberal parties
2018 establishments in Sweden
Political parties established in 2018
Organizations based in Malmö